Township 12 is a township in Rooks County, Kansas, United States. Codell is the largest population center in Township 12.

History
Rooks County was established with four townships: Bow Creek, Lowell, Paradise and Stockton. That number increased to seven by 1878 and twenty three in 1925. The twenty three townships were in place until 1971 when the number was reduced to the current twelve townships.

Township 12 was formed from Rooks County townships Corning and Paradise in 1971 pursuant to Kansas Statute 80-1110. 80-1110 allowed for the disorganization of townships and assigning those territories to contiguous townships.

Paradise Creek, labeled as Salt Creek on early maps, runs across Township 12 before flowing into the Saline River in Russell County.

Corning Township
Corning Township was established from part of Paradise Township around 1884.

Paradise Township
Paradise was one of the four original Rooks County civil townships along with Bow Creek, Lowell and Stockton. The original Paradise Township was 12 miles north-to-south (2 survey townships). The east border was the Osborne County line. The west border the Graham County line making Paradise 30 miles (5 survey townships) wide.

Corning, Fairview, Logan, Northampton, Plainville, Twin Mound and Walton townships were all formed from Paradise Township. Paradise was a double township until Township 12 was created.

References

Townships in Rooks County, Kansas
Townships in Kansas